Joseph Henderson may refer to:

 Joseph Henderson (artist) (1832–1908), Scottish painter
 Joseph Henderson (Medal of Honor) (1869–1938), recipient of the Medal of Honor for actions during the Moro Uprising in 1909
 Joseph Henderson (Pennsylvania politician) (1791–1863), United States Congressman from Pennsylvania
 Joseph Henderson, 1st Baron Henderson of Ardwick (1884–1950), British Labour Member of Parliament for Manchester Ardwick 1931 and 1935–1950
 Joseph Henderson (pilot) (1826–1890), Sandy Hook pilot in New York harbor and along the Atlantic Coast during the Civil War
 Joseph Welles Henderson (1890–1957), acting president of Bucknell University, 1953–1954
 Joseph L. Henderson (1903–2007), American physician and psychologist.
 Joseph Morris Henderson (1863–1936), Scottish painter

See also
Joe Henderson (disambiguation)
Joey Henderson, fictional character on Shortland Street